Layzell may refer to:

 Layzell Gyroplanes, a British aircraft manufacturer started by Gary Layzell
Layzell Cricket, a Layzell Gyroplanes gyroplane design
Layzell Merlin, a Layzell Gyroplanes gyroplane design
 Alastair Layzell (born 1958), Jersey television producer and politician
 Martyn Layzell, British Anglican minister
 Naomi Layzell, English footballer
 Paul Layzell (born 1957), British software engineer, academic, and academic administrator